Doyle Lane (1925–2002) was an African-American ceramist known for his innovative, tactile glazes. His work ranged from delicate vases and ceramic sculptures to large scale clay paintings and mosaics. Lane maintained a studio in the El Sereno district of East Los Angeles. He exhibited his work at Brockman Gallery in Leimert Park (1968) and Ankrum Gallery on La Cienega Boulevard (1967, 1968), both notable centers for African American Art in Los Angeles in the mid-twentieth century.

Early life and education

Born in New Orleans, he moved to Los Angeles by the early 1950s. He studied at Los Angeles City College, East Los Angeles City College before attending the University of Southern California. Early in his career, he worked as a glaze technician for L.H. Butcher and Co. Later he would maintain a self-supporting practice as a studio ceramist.

Major Commissions
Lane created large-scale clay paintings for many prominent sites in Southern California.
 California Lutheran Nursing Home and Health Center (Alhambra)
 Golden State Bank (Downey)
 Equitable Savings and Loan (Canoga Park)
 International Children's School (Los Angeles) 
 Miller Robinson (Santa Fe Springs) 
 Mutual Savings and Loan, 1964 (Pasadena), acquired by the Huntington Library
 Pantry Foods (Pasadena)

Works

Exhibitions
 California Design 4, Pasadena Art Museum (1958)
 California Design 5, Pasadena Art Museum (1959) 
 California Design 6, Pasadena Art Museum (1960)
 Ankrum Gallery (1967)
 Ankrum Gallery (1968) 
 Brockman Gallery (1968)
 Objects: USA (1969)
 California Black Craftsmen, Mills College Art Gallery (1970)
 Solo exhibition at Los Angeles City College Art Gallery (October 1977)
 California Design, 1930-1965: "Living in A Modern Way," Los Angeles County Museum of Art (October 1, 2011- June 3, 2012)
 Doyle Lane: Clay Paintings, The Landing at Reform Gallery (solo exhibition, May 1-July 5, 2014)

Public Collections
  Los Angeles County Museum of Art
  Oakland Museum of California
  California African American Museum
  Smithsonian American Art Museum
  Huntington Library

References

American ceramists
American potters
African-American artists
1925 births
2002 deaths
Artists from New Orleans
Los Angeles City College alumni
University of Southern California alumni
Artists from Los Angeles
20th-century ceramists
20th-century African-American people
21st-century African-American people
African-American ceramists